George Wilder "Dim" Batterson (October 3, 1881 – December 3, 1935) was an American football coach for high school, college and professional teams. Batterson's ability to turn out players of All-American ability and knack of moulding Harvard Cup championship eleven at Masten Park high school in Buffalo, New York earned him the distinction of being one of the most astute scholastic coach in western New York state history.

Playing days
At the turn of the century, in 1899, 1900 and 1901, Batterson coached and played fullback for the Oakdales, a semi-pro football club from South Buffalo, New York. During that time, he was considered one of the greatest backfield men in upstate New York. Besides the Oakdales, he played with the Elmwoods, Manhattan Athletic club, Erie Athletic club, and the Pittsburgh, Detroit and Toledo professional teams. Around 1905, Batterson played for the Buffalo All-Stars, an early semi-pro football team, who would later evolve into the Buffalo All-Americans-Rangers-Bisons franchise.

Coaching career
Batterson started his coaching career at the high school level. He won four Buffalo City High School Championships (called Harvard Cups) while coaching at Masten Park High School including three consecutive in 1918, 1919 and 1920.

Batterson left the high school ranks in 1922 to become the football coach at the University at Buffalo. He lasted one year at the University winning only one game.

Batterson then coached with the Buffalo Bisons and Rangers of the early National Football League. Batterson was first brought onto the team as an assistant coach by his former student at Masten Park High, Walter Koppisch, in 1925, and he stayed in that position in 1926.  He was named the team's head coach at the start of the 1927 NFL season and was the first head coach in the team's history not to be a player-coach. 
Unfortunately, the 1927 season was a disaster.  Financial woes plagued the team from the start. The team lost 5 consecutive starts, bowing to Pottsville, 22 to 0; Providence, 5 to 0; New York Yankees, 19 to 8 and Frankford Yellowjackets twice, 54 to 0 and 23 to 0. After the 5th straight humiliating defeat, Batterson resigned and the team disbanded. Batterson never coached in the NFL again leaving his career coaching record at 0 won, five lost (0–5).

Later years and honors
After retiring from coaching, Batterson was in the real estate business in the Buffalo suburb of Tonawanda, New York.  He died at the age of 51 on December 5, 1935 in Buffalo General Hospital due to complications from a hernia surgery.

He was elected to Harvard Cup Hall of Fame in 2002.

Head coaching record

College

Professional

Notes

References

1881 births
1935 deaths
19th-century players of American football
American football fullbacks
Buffalo Bisons (NFL) coaches
Buffalo Bulls football coaches
High school football coaches in New York (state)
Coaches of American football from New York (state)
Players of American football from Buffalo, New York